Scholtzia ciliata is a shrub species in the family Myrtaceae that is endemic to Western Australia.

It blooms between August and December producing pink-white flowers.

It is found on low hills along the west coast in the Mid West and Wheatbelt regions of Western Australia between Northampton and Dandaragan where it grows in sandy or clay soils.

References

ciliata
Plants described in 1864
Taxa named by Ferdinand von Mueller